Kieta is a port town located on the eastern coast of the island of Bougainville in Papua New Guinea, near the township of Arawa. After extensive destruction during the 1990 Civil Uprising on Bougainville, Kieta has few inhabitants now, and is known mainly for its transport connections (wharf and airfield).

History
On 17 May 1885, agreements were made between Germany and the United Kingdom over the islands of Bougainville and Buka in the area of the German sphere of interest. On 20 September 1905 a station was built with a post office and customs. Since 1902, there was a Catholic mission station in Kieta.

Kieta was occupied by the Japanese during the Second World War.

The majority of the town was destroyed in the 1990 Civil Uprising on Bougainville.
The airfield has a  runway which was used by the Japanese in World War II, and was recently serviced by Air Niugini until 1990. For some time after that the only aircraft to service the area had been the Royal Australian Air Force and Royal New Zealand Air Forces (C130 Hercules) in support of the Peace Monitoring Group. As of 2021, Kieta Airport is serviced by PNG Air with flights to Rabaul and Buka.

A number of Papuan languages are spoken in the Kieta district, such as Naasioi.

Climate 

References 

Populated places in the Autonomous Region of Bougainville
Populated coastal places in Papua New Guinea